Olof Carl Malmquist (October 26, 1894 – August 18, 1975) was an American sculptor. He is best known for his public art in Northern California.

Malmquist was born in Wallingford, Connecticut in 1894. He studied under Lee Lawrie at Yale University. He graduated from the Yale School of Fine Arts in 1916, received the Wirt Winchester Fellowship that year, and with the fellowship continued his studies at the American Academy in Rome.

He moved to San Francisco in 1922. His noted works in the region include the Marine Firemen's Union building in San Francisco, the San Bruno Public Library, the east entrance of the California State Capitol, and San Francisco's St. Gabriel Church. He contributed much to the sculpture on Treasure Island as part of the Golden Gate International Exposition in 1939.

Malmquist died on August 18, 1975, in San Francisco.

References

1894 births
1975 deaths
20th-century American sculptors
20th-century American male artists
American male sculptors
Yale School of Art alumni
Artists from San Francisco
Sculptors from Connecticut
Sculptors from California